Simonurius is a genus of South American jumping spiders that was first described by María Elena Galiano in 1988. The name is a reference to arachnologist Eugène Simon.

Species
 it contains four species, found in South America:
Simonurius expers Galiano, 1988 – Argentina
Simonurius gladifer (Simon, 1901) (type) – Brazil, Argentina
Simonurius pisac (Galiano, 1985) – Peru
Simonurius quadratarius (Simon, 1901) – Colombia, Venezuela

References

Salticidae genera
Salticidae
Spiders of South America